Lovells is a London-based international law firm that merged with Hogan & Hartson in 2010 to form Hogan Lovells.

Lovells may also refer to:

 Lovells Township, Michigan, USA
 Lovells Athletic F.C., a former works football club for Lovell's sweet factory in Newport, South Wales, England
 Lovells Island, Massachusetts, USA

See also 
 Lovell (disambiguation)